Slickville Historic District is a national historic district located at Salem Township, Westmoreland County, Pennsylvania. It encompasses 90 contributing buildings and 1 contributing structure in the unincorporated village of Slickville. The Cambria Steel Company built the mining town between 1916 and 1923. The contributing resources include workers' and managers' housing, four utilitarian mine-related buildings, a church, a school, a pump house, and a company store. The company-built community was later acquired by Bethlehem Steel, who operated Slick Mine No. 91 after 1923.

It was added to the National Register of Historic Places in 1994.

References

External links

Historic American Engineering Record in Pennsylvania
Historic districts on the National Register of Historic Places in Pennsylvania
Historic districts in Westmoreland County, Pennsylvania
National Register of Historic Places in Westmoreland County, Pennsylvania